Call of the Forest is a 1949 American Western film directed by John F. Link and starring Robert Lowery, Ken Curtis, Chief Thundercloud, Black Diamond and Charlie Hughes. It was also known as The Flaming Forest and Untamed.

The Los Angeles Times reviewer thought it "seemed to be cramming all the outdoors pictures ever made into one".

Plot
A rancher and prospector Bob Brand (Ken Curtis) searches for riches from a lost gold mine, his son Bobby (Charlie Hughes) befriends an American Indian named Stormcloud (Chief Thundercloud). As a reward for Bobby's kindness, Stormcloud provides him with a map to the mine, so he can help his father's search. Greedy Sam Harrison (Robert Lowery) gets wind of the map, however, and attempts to violently upset their plans. After Harrison defeats Bob, Bobby and his stallion, King, must confront the dangerous man.

Cast
 Robert Lowery as Sam Harrison
 Ken Curtis as Bob Brand
 Chief Thundercloud as Stormcloud
 Black Diamond as King, the stallion
 Charlie Hughes as Bobby Brand
 Martha Sherrill as Nancy Sommers
 Tom Hanly as Dan McKay
 Fred Gildart as Pinto Peterson
 Eula Guy as Mrs. Joe
 Jimmy the Crow as The Crow 
 Beady the Raccoon as The Raccoon 
 Ripple the Deer as The Deer
 Fuzzy the Bear as The Bear

References

External links
 
 
 

1949 films
1949 Western (genre) films
American Western (genre) films
American black-and-white films
Films about horses
Films scored by Karl Hajos
Lippert Pictures films
1940s English-language films
1940s American films